Madhuben and Bhanubhai Patel  Institute of technology is an engineering college in Vallabh Vidyanagar, Anand District in Gujarat in India. It was the first engineering college exclusively for women in the state(For both boys and girls 2019 onwards). It has three hostels.

References

Universities and colleges in Ahmedabad
Engineering colleges in Gujarat
Women's engineering colleges in India
Women's universities and colleges in Gujarat